Schönenberg is a former municipality in the district of Horgen in the canton of Zürich in Switzerland. On 1 January 2019 the former municipalities of Hütten and Schönenberg merged into the municipality of Wädenswil.

Geography

Of this area, 77.1% is used for agricultural purposes, while 11.3% is forested. Of the rest of the land, 9.2% is settled (buildings or roads) and the remainder (2.4%) is non-productive (rivers, glaciers or mountains).   housing and buildings made up 7% of the total area, while transportation infrastructure made up the rest (2.2%). Of the total unproductive area, water (streams and lakes) made up 1.3% of the area.   3.2% of the total municipal area was undergoing some type of construction.

Teufenbachweiher is a reservoir on the Teufenbach creek.

Demographics
, 8.9% of the population was made up of foreign nationals.   the gender distribution of the population was 49.6% male and 50.4% female. Over the last 10 years the population has grown at a rate of 11.6%. Most of the population speaks German  (96.5%), with French being second most common ( 0.8%) and English being third ( 0.8%).

In the 2007 election the most popular party was the SVP which received 49.8% of the vote.  The next three most popular parties were the FDP (13.3%), the SPS (10.2%) and the CSP (9.2%).

The age distribution of the population is children and teenagers (0–19 years old) make up 26.1% of the population, while adults (20–64 years old) make up 60.3% and seniors (over 64 years old) make up 13.7%.  In Schönenberg about 81% of the population (between age 25-64) have completed either non-mandatory upper secondary education or additional higher education (either university or a Fachhochschule).  There are 670 households in Schönenberg.

Schönenberg has an unemployment rate of 1.05%.  , there were 167 people employed in the primary economic sector and about 58 businesses involved in this sector.  103 people are employed in the secondary sector and there are 19 businesses in this sector.  232 people are employed in the tertiary sector, with 58 businesses in this sector.   37.2% of the working population were employed full-time, and 62.8% were employed part-time.

 there were 595 Catholics and 975 Protestants in Schönenberg. In the 2000 census, religion was broken down into several smaller categories. Of the rest of the population, 0% were Muslim, 1.4% belonged to another religion (not listed), 1.8% did not give a religion, and 8.8% were atheist or agnostic.

Transportation 
The Zimmerberg bus line (Zimmerbergbus), provided by the Sihltal Zürich Uetliberg Bahn (SZU), connects the Zimmerberg region and parts of the Sihl valley.

References

External links 

 Official website 

Former municipalities of the canton of Zürich